Alexey Tsatevich (born 5 July 1989) is a Russian professional road bicycle racer, who last rode for UCI Professional Continental team .

Career
Born in Verkhnyaya Pyshma in the then-Soviet Union, Tsatevich has competed as a professional since the start of the 2012 season, when he joined , having previously competed for the squad's feeder team –  – in 2011. After several top ten placements during the 2012 season, Tsatevich achieved the first win of his professional career in February 2013, when he won the 1.1-categorised Le Samyn race in Belgium. Tsatevich attacked with around  remaining, and was able to beat the peloton to the line, in Dour.

He was named in the start list for the 2016 Giro d'Italia. On Stage 9, the individual time trial, Tsatevich was fined for drafting behind Tobias Ludvigsson. Further to this, Team Katusha took the step to withdraw him from the race.

Major results

2007
 1st Trofeo San Rocco
 10th Overall Trophée Centre Morbihan
1st Stage 1
2008
 1st 2 Giorni Marchigiana
2009
 4th Trofeo Città di San Vendemiano
 9th Gran Premio della Liberazione
 10th GP Inda
2010
 1st Overall Gagra–Sukhumi
1st Stage 1
 2nd Coppa del Mobilio
 10th Gran Premio della Liberazione
2011
 1st  Criterium, National Road Championships
 1st Grand Prix de la ville de Nogent-sur-Oise
 1st Stage 2 Tour of Yeroskipos
 1st Stage 2 GP Costa Azul
 1st Stage 4 Tour Alsace
 1st Stage 6 Tour of Bulgaria
 2nd La Côte Picarde
 2nd Grand Prix of Moscow
 2nd Central European Tour Budapest GP
 7th ZLM Tour
 7th GP Kranj
 8th Road race, UCI Under-23 Road World Championships
 10th Mayor Cup
2012
 8th Trofeo Palma de Mallorca
 8th Le Samyn
 8th Volta Limburg Classic
 10th Trofeo Migjorn
2013
 1st Le Samyn
 1st Stage 3 Settimana Ciclistica Lombarda
 9th Eschborn-Frankfurt City Loop
 10th Overall Tour of Belgium
2014
 2nd Le Samyn
 7th Gent–Wevelgem
 10th Brabantse Pijl
2015
 3rd Trofeo Laigueglia
 6th Overall Tour du Haut Var
 10th Overall Circuit de la Sarthe
 10th Dwars door Vlaanderen
2016
 1st Stage 7 Volta a Catalunya
 2nd Clásica de Almería
 6th Road race, National Road Championships
 7th Cadel Evans Great Ocean Road Race

Grand Tour general classification results timeline

References

External links

Team Katusha profile

Cycling Quotient profile

Russian male cyclists
1989 births
Living people
People from Verkhnyaya Pyshma
European Games competitors for Russia
Cyclists at the 2015 European Games
Sportspeople from Sverdlovsk Oblast